Keith Ollerenshaw (28 September 1928 – 15 March 2016) was an Australian long-distance runner who competed in the 1956 Summer Olympics.

References

1928 births
2016 deaths
Australian male long-distance runners
Olympic athletes of Australia
Athletes (track and field) at the 1956 Summer Olympics